Phoebe, Junior: A Last Chronicle of Carlingford (also spelled Phœbe, Junior) is an 1876 novel by Margaret Oliphant.  It follows the exploits of its heroine, Phoebe Beecham, as she learns the true history of her family history.  This novel is the last of the six Carlingford Chronicles, and is set roughly in the early 1860s to late 1870s. The theme is social status and snobbery, when earlier conventions were challenged by changes in religion and politics in Victorian society.  Phoebe Junior was dramatised by BBC Radio Four in 1993.

Adaptations
BBC Radio 4 produced a four-part radio adaptation first broadcast on 8 May 1994, dramatized by Elizabeth Proud and featuring Elizabeth Spriggs as Margaret Oliphant and Charlotte Attenborough as Phoebe, Junior.

References

Further reading
 O'Mealy, Joseph H. (1997). "Rewriting Trollope and Yonge: Mrs. Oliphant's Phoebe Junior and the Realism Wars," Texas Studies in Literature and Language, Vol. 39, No. 2, pp. 125–138.

External links
 Phoebe, Junior, at Project Gutenberg
 
 Phoebe, Junior, at Hathi Trust
 

1876 British novels
Scottish novels
Victorian novels